Isfjorden, meaning "ice fjord", may refer to:

Places
 Isfjorden (Svalbard), a fjord on the island of Spitsbergen in Svalbard, Norway
 Isfjorden (village), a village in Rauma Municipality, Norway
 Isfjorden (fjord in Møre og Romsdal), a fjord in Rauma Municipality, Norway
 Isfjorden (Troms), a fjord in Kvænangen Municipality, Norway
 Isfjord, a fjord in eastern Greenland

Other
 , Norwegian cargo and passenger ship in service in the early 20th century
 Isfjord Radio in Svalbard

See also
Ice Fjord, South Georgia
Ísafjörður in Iceland